The El-Abry Museum for Heritage and Classic Cars is a museum at Riyadh Al Khabra, Al-Qassim Region, Saudi Arabia, founded by Abdulrahman bin Nasser Alebry.

Overview 
The museum contains a main hall, great courtyard, (Sawani) and exhibition. The exhibition includes old heritage items such as weapons, currency, documents, hospitality tools, lighting tools, agricultural instruments, audio devices, wood and leather crafts and taxidermy exhibits. It also has the old kitchen and bedroom which contain all their original furnishings. In the great courtyard, there is a sawani (camel-operated well), a jusah (storage compartment for dates), classic cars, and old fuel dispensers.

See also 

 List of museums in Saudi Arabia

History museums in Saudi Arabia
Automotive museums
Al-Qassim Province
Museums in Saudi Arabia